The George D. Widener Memorial Gold Medal was a prestigious sculpture prize awarded by the Pennsylvania Academy of the Fine Arts from 1913 to 1968. Established in 1912, it recognized the "most meritorious work of Sculpture modeled by an American citizen and shown in the Annual Exhibition." PAFA's annual exhibitions were open to all American sculptors, but an individual could be awarded the medal only once. Sculptors Paul Manship, Albin Polasek, Malvina Hoffman, Carl Paul Jennewein, Anna Hyatt Huntington, William Zorach and Leonard Baskin were among its recipients.

George Dunton Widener had been a Philadelphia businessman and a director of PAFA.

The Widener Gold Medal was retired in 1968. Beginning in 1969, PAFA devoted its annual exhibitions solely to work by students in its school.

List of Recipients

See also
Temple Gold Medal
Beck Gold Medal
Mary Smith Prize

References 

Pennsylvania Academy of the Fine Arts
Sculpture awards
American sculpture awards
American visual arts awards